Aiboland (also known as Swedish Estonia and Egeland) is the Estonian Swedish name for the historically Swedish-speaking areas and towns of northern and western Estonia.

Historical Aiboland encompasses  Nuckö,  Ormsö,  Runö,  Odensholm,  Dagö,  Ösel,  Moon,  Nargö,  Rågöarna, and the towns around  Hapsal on the Estonian mainland.

During World War II, in the summer of 1944, nearly all of the Estonian Swedes living in Aiboland fled to Sweden before the Red Army invaded the Baltic states.

External links
Aibolands Museum in Haapsalu 

Historical regions in Estonia
Swedish diaspora